Kodardas Kalidas Shah (October 15, 1908 
– March 14, 1986) was an Indian politician who served as the Governor of Tamil Nadu from 1971 to 1976.

He was born in khadayat vanik family in Gabat village in Bayad Taluka of Sabarkantha District in present-day Gujarat and was a solicitor by profession. He died on March 14, 1986, due to cardiac arrest in Calcutta. His son Prakash Shah is a practicing CPA in Salinas, California and runs a CPA firm by the name of Stevens, Sloan, & Shah.

References

1908 births
1986 deaths
Governors of Tamil Nadu
People from Sabarkantha district
Rajya Sabha members from Gujarat
Leaders of the Rajya Sabha
Ministers for Information and Broadcasting of India